Minnesota Mr. Basketball is an annual award recognizing excellence in Minnesota boys' high school basketball. The female equivalent is Minnesota Miss Basketball.

The award's legitimacy was challenged in February 2017 when Henry Sibley, Minnesota high school basketball coach John Carrier called out owner and chairman Ken Lien for his politicized anti-Muslim and anti-immigrant tweets from the @mrbasketballmn Twitter account. The Minnesota Basketball Coaches Association was among many who announced their support of Carrier's complaint.

The award was established in 1975 and is given to the person(s) chosen as the best high school boys' basketball senior in the U.S. state of Minnesota. The award is the fourth oldest such award in the nation; only Indiana Mr. Basketball, California Mr. Basketball, and Kentucky Mr. Basketball, which were first awarded in 1939, 1950, and 1956, respectively, predate it. A nine-member selection committee, headed by Ken Lien since 1977, has selected five finalists in March of every year since the award began. Those five finalists are chosen from a larger pool of 15 finalists picked in January, and the winner of the award is named in April. In order to select the most deserving student-athlete, the selection panel watches over 120 high school basketball games and creates detailed reviews on every one of them. The winner is then invited to an honorary dinner, along with the Minnesota Miss Basketball selection. Twice the panel chose two winners, in 1979 and 1998.

The first award winner was Gene Glynn, who attended Waseca High School in Waseca, Minnesota. He played for Mankato State University, now known as Minnesota State University.

Four recipients of the Minnesota Mr. Basketball award were enrolled at Hopkins High School and Minneapolis North High School, the most of any high school. Most recipients go to Division I universities, with a high of 17 attending the University of Minnesota. Glynn, the 1975 winner; Jim Jensen, the 1978 winner; Steve Schlotthauer, the 1986 winner; Tom Conroy, the 1989 winner; Joel McDonald, the 1991 winner; and Bret Yonke, the 1992 winner, all attended Division II schools. Conroy attended Northeastern Illinois University, which upgraded to Division I in 1991, his sophomore year. Yonke began his career at Division I Northwestern and later transferred to Division II St. Cloud State due to lack of playing time. The 1981 winner, Redd Overton, never attended a university and chose the junior college route instead.

Several former Minnesota Mr. Basketballs have been selected in the  National Basketball Association Draft. Kevin McHale, the 1976 choice; Randy Breuer, the 1979 co-choice; Sam Jacobson, the 1994 choice; Joel Przybilla, the 1998 co-choice; and Kris Humphries, the 2003 choice, were picked in the first round. Kevin Lynch, the 1987 choice; Khalid El-Amin, the 1997 choice; and 2001 choice Rick Rickert were picked in the second round. Jim Petersen, the 1980 choice, was the only pick in the now obsolete third round. McHale, drafted by the Boston Celtics with the third overall pick in the 1980 NBA draft, is the highest-drafted Minnesota Mr. Basketball winner. He went on to have a successful NBA career, winning three NBA championships with the Celtics (1981, 1984, 1986) and being inducted to the Basketball Hall of Fame in 1999.

Award winners

Most winners

See also
Minnesota Miss Basketball

Notes

References

Mr. and Miss Basketball awards
Awards established in 1975
Minnesota State High School League
Lists of people from Minnesota
Minnesota sports-related lists